John Davidson MBE (born 1971 or 1972) is a Scottish campaigner for Tourette syndrome, who lives in Galashiels. At age 16, Davidson was the subject of the BBC TV documentary John's Not Mad (1989) about the manifestations of Tourette syndrome with which he lived, and a number of follow-up BBC documentaries throughout his life. He is a "nationally known ambassador for the condition", who gives talks and workshops for school pupils, teachers and police, and has organised an annual two-day residential Tourette camp for young people. In 2019 he was awarded an MBE in recognition of "his efforts to increase understanding of the condition and helping families deal with it across the country."

Biography
Davidson's condition encompasses a range of symptoms: Tourette syndrome tics including coprolalia, echolalia, sudden and violent body movements; as well as a severe form of obsessive–compulsive disorder (OCD). At age 16 a BBC TV documentary was made about him, John's Not Mad (1989), which "became a major talking point" nationally—in 2004 The Times reported that "Davidson occupies a position in the psyche of 1980s schoolchildren similar to that of the Joey Deacon, who had cerebral palsy, for the kids of the 1970s. Both were the subjects of serious television programmes about their disabilities, and both promptly became the victims of nationwide playground mocking campaigns." A follow-up BBC TV documentary was made about him at age 30, The Boy Can't Help It (2002), and another, Tourettes: I Swear I Can't Help It (2009), caught up with him at age 37.

After leaving school at age 16 without qualifications, Davidson has worked his whole life as a caretaker at Langlee Community Centre in Galashiels. He has also done a lot of voluntary youth work. As of 2002 he was a part-time youth leader at Loganlea Community Centre and education complex in Galashiels.

Since the broadcast of John's Not Mad, Davidson went on to become a "nationally known ambassador for the condition", "a spokesman for this previously hidden neurological disorder, campaigning to educate people about it." In 2003 he founded a Borders support group aimed at helping the families of those with the condition. Working with support groups such as Tourette Scotland and national organisation Tourettes Action he has visited schools, given talks, and held workshops on living with Tourette syndrome, and spoken to groups of police and school teachers on supporting people with the condition. He has organised an annual two-day residential Tourette camp for young people in Galashiels:
"People who feel isolated in their own town can come to Galashiels for a weekend and feel part of a like-minded tribe," said John. "They can shout as loud as they like without worrying about upsetting or offending others. Hopefully, they return to their homes in better fettle and feeling stronger and less isolated."
As of 2019 he was a board member of Tourette Scotland. In 2019 he was awarded an MBE in recognition of "his efforts to increase understanding of the condition and helping families deal with it across the country." He has also been a leading member of Borders Action Group, campaigning to save public services.

Films
John's Not Mad (1989) – Q.E.D. series, by Valerie Kaye, broadcast on the BBC One. Features Davidson.
The Boy Can't Help It (2002) – directed by Min Clough, produced by Todd Austin, broadcast on BBC One. Features Davidson and Greg Storey.
Tourettes and Me (2007) – Only Human series, broadcast on Channel 4. Includes Davidson and Keith Allen.
Tourettes: I Swear I Can't Help It (2009) – Q.E.D. series, directed and produced by Philippa Robinson, executive produced by Todd Austin, broadcast on BBC One. Features Davidson and Greg Storey. Features Davidson and Storey.
Tourette's: Teenage Tics (2016) – by Min Clough and Todd Austin, broadcast on BBC One. Features Davidson, Storey, Angela Scanlon, Rory Brown and Paul Stevenson.

References

External links
John's Not Mad (1989) – documentary film at Dailymotion
The Boy Can't Help It (2002) – documentary film at Dailymotion
Tourettes: I Swear I Can't Help It (2009) – documentary film at YouTube
Tourettes and Me (2007) – documentary film at YouTube

Tourette syndrome
People educated at Galashiels Academy
People from Galashiels
Date of birth missing (living people)
Place of birth missing (living people)
Living people
People with Tourette syndrome
People with obsessive–compulsive disorder
1971 births